Chrysoclista zagulajevi is a species of moth of the family Agonoxenidae. It is found in Georgia and Adjara (Transcaucasia).

The wingspan is about 10 mm. Adults have been recorded on wing in July.

References

Moths described in 1979
Agonoxeninae
Moths of Asia